The green tinkerbird (Pogoniulus simplex) is a species of bird in the Lybiidae family (African barbets).
It is found in Kenya, Malawi, Mozambique, and Tanzania.

The Eastern Green Tinkerbird, Pogoniulus simplex, (Fischer & Reichenow, 1884) is a small, dull-green tinkerbird that has been included in a broadly-defined tinkerbird genus Pogoniulus (Lafresnaye, 1842) by most recent authorities. The present paper, however, places simplex, and its relative leucomystax, the Moustached Green Tinkerbird, in the genus Viridibucco (Oberholser, 1905) because the plumage patterns of these two species differ markedly from other tinkerbirds and there is an indication that they have a unique, hyper-specialized diet.

Until recently, the Eastern Green Tinkerbird has been known from the southern African region only on the basis of a single skin from Chicomo, Funhalouro District, Inhambane Province, Mozambique (Pinto 1959, 1960; Clancey 1971, 1996). During the course of this investigation, a further overlooked locality for the species, the Gorongosa Massif, also came to light, as discussed further below.

This paper documents the recent rediscovery of Eastern Green Tinkerbird in southern Africa and summarises information on selected uncommon or noteworthy species found in the coastal, dry, forest-thicket complex of the Sitila-Massinga district, Inhambane Province, Mozambique, by extracting records from the specimen database of the Durban Natural Science Museum, South Africa, and personal observations during two brief field-trips to Gaza and Inhambane provinces, Sul do Save, Mozambique. The term ‘Sul do Save’ refers to Mozambique south of the Save River and comprising the provinces of Maputo, Gaza and Inhambane. This term is employed in preference to ‘southern Mozambique’, which in the ornithological literature, has come to have a vague meaning and is often applied to Mozambique south of the Zambezi River (e.g. Clancey 1996). A brief popular account of the rediscovery of the Eastern Green Tinkerbird in Sul do Save, Mozambique has been written (Davies & Chittenden 2013) but fuller discussion and amplification of certain points is required.

The original Eastern Green Tinkerbird skin from Sul do Save, was collected for the Museu Dr Álvaro de Castro (Maputo Natural History Museum; museum registration number 6184) near the village of Chicomo on 15 January 1958 by Rui Quadros (1937- 2010), whom Pinto (1959: 15) called an “incansável colector” (tireless collector). Pinto (1959: 20) justifiably referred to Quadros's tinkerbird as “uma notável descoberta” (a remarkable discovery) because the nearest records at that time were from eastern Malawi, approximately 750 km to the north (Benson 1953: 44).

The Quadros skin is still in existence and remains in adequate condition (photos of the skin forwarded in September 2013 by G. Allport). Clancey (1984: 180) tentatively ascribed the Quadros skin to the subspecies hylodytes, otherwise only known from Malawi, which putatively differed from the nominate subspecies (of Tanzania and Kenya) by being larger in size, darker above and more dusky grey-olive below.

In discussing the tinkerbird in his Appendix 1, Parker (1999: 265) introduced an unfortunate locality error. Parker (1999: 265) gave the quarter-degree-grid (15’ X 15’) square reference for Chicomo as “2434CA”. There is indeed a town called Chicomo in that grid- cell, which lies 40 km south-west of Coguno, a collecting locality made famous by C.H.B. Grant as the type locality of Rudd's Apalis Apalis ruddi and Neergaard's Sunbird Cinnyris neergaardi. But this is not the Chicomo that Quadros visited, as is evident from reading Pinto's (1959, 1960) reports. Clancey (1971, 1996) also referred to the “Funhalouro district”, which is far from Coguno. The pertinent Chicomo village is at 22° 46’ 29.55”S; 35° 01’ 07.55”E and lies approximately 65 km north-west of the town of Massinga.

In The Atlas of Southern African Birds, Spottiswoode (1997) worsened the error by giving Chicomo's quarter-degree-grid square reference as 2034CA (i.e. a grid-cell north of the Save River in a mixed savanna area); this was clearly a lapsus calami for 2434CA. The map for the Eastern Green Tinkerbird in the seventh edition of Roberts Birds of Southern Africa (Hockey et al. 2005: 141) copied the incorrect Chicomo locality from Parker (1999) as well as the false locality reference given by Spottiswoode (1997), but unfortunately did not mark the correct Chicomo. More recently, Dowsett-Lemaire (2010) repeated the erroneous Chicomo grid- reference as “2434C1”.

The Roberts 7 map also placed a question mark in the Inhaminga district, Sofala Province of central Mozambique. This stemmed from P.A. Clancey's possible sighting of the tinkerbird “in forest- woodland mosaic near Inhaminga ... in June 1968” (Clancey 1971: 294, 1996: 150). When questioned by H.N. Chittenden (pers. comm.) regarding this sighting in the late 1990s, Clancey said he had only seen “something small and green in the canopy”. Michael P.S. Irwin, who was with Clancey during the June 1968 expedition, has no recollection of Clancey mentioning such a noteworthy record while in the field (Irwin in litt., September 2013) and consequently, given the lack of any adequate supporting information, Clancey's record should be viewed with circumspection.

Subsequent to Quadros's skin, no further acceptable records of Eastern Green Tinkerbird from southern Africa came to light. Clancey (1996) summarised its status as “unknown” and Spottiswoode (1997) as “uncertain”, while Parker (1999: xxiii) called it “tantalisingly obscure”.

At the time the popular account (Davies & Chittenden 2013) was written, the present author was unaware of any other reliable records of Eastern Green Tinkerbird for southern Mozambique, aside from Quadros's skin. However, this overlooked K.L. Tinley's (1977: table 9.6) unpublished thesis for the Gorongosa area, Sofala Province, in which Eastern Green Tinkerbird was listed as a frugivore dispersal agent on the Gorongosa Massif. A highly experienced naturalist, K.L. Tinley (in litt., 16 May 2013) confirms that “I frequently saw [Eastern Green Tinkerbird] when I climbed the footpath through the forest once a month [1969-1972] to the highest plateau to collect and record the phenology of the summit grasslands”. This footpath approximately ran from the Murombedzi Waterfall (18° 29’ S, 34°0 2’ E, ca 850 m asl) up to the summit on the south-west side of the massif (with complete altitudinal sequence of wet, closed-canopy forest up to ca 1800 m asl). No other records exist from Gorongosa Massif.

Following the end of the civil war, Parker (1999, 2005a) undertook an ambitious, largely single-handed atlassing project in Mozambique, mostly south of the Zambezi River. Given the vast area he had to cover and severe logistical constraints, his investigation of individual 15’ x 15’ grid-cells could often be no more than cursory. He did not encounter Eastern Green Tinkerbird during his seven years in southern Mozambique, although he later found the species in Niassa Province, northern Mozambique (Parker 2005b). Thus, by the 2000s, the status of the Eastern Green Tinkerbird south of the Zambezi River remained enigmatic and there was even some speculation that the locality information of the original skin was suspect (e.g. Sinclair et al. 2011: 274).

Nuttall (1998), in a popular account of the Olive-headed Weaver Ploceus olivaeiceps in the Panda district, Inhambane Province, mentioned Eastern Green Tinkerbird as one of the species he had seen in that area. However, Nuttall cannot recall the details of this sighting and reports that it was mentioned in error (D. Nuttall in litt., June 2012). Furthermore, the habitat in the Panda area is predominantly tall Brachystegia woodland and subsistence agricultural plots and it is unlikely the tinkerbird would occur there.

References

External links

 Green tinkerbird - Species text in The Atlas of Southern African Birds

green tinkerbird
Birds of East Africa
green tinkerbird
green tinkerbird
Taxonomy articles created by Polbot